"She's Leaving Home" is the 22nd and 23rd episode of the eleventh season of the American television medical drama Grey's Anatomy, and the 242nd and 243rd episode overall. The episodes aired on April 30, 2015 on ABC in the United States. The episodes were written by Stacy McKee and directed by Chris Hayden. On its initial airing it was watched by 8.74 million viewers.

The two-hour episode serves as a tribute to the death of Derek Shepherd, the show's male lead played by Patrick Dempsey, who died in a car accident in the previous episode. In the episode, the doctors at the Grey-Sloan Memorial Hospital mourn the death of their colleague and friend following the tragic accident. The episode also focuses on the struggle of Meredith Grey (Derek's wife and the show's protagonist) after she disappears from Seattle and adapts to becoming a single mother before giving birth to her third child, Ellis Shepherd.

Plot
Meredith returns to Grey Sloan Memorial to reveal the news of Derek’s death. Most of the doctors experience the usual sadness and tears, all except one. Amelia hides behind morbid jokes about her brother being dead, which catches her colleagues off guard. After the funeral, Meredith goes AWOL. No one knows where she is, and except for a note left behind that says she and the kids are okay, no one can reach her to ask her whereabouts.

Bailey and Ben argue about how they want to be cared for if anything ever happens to them. Bailey wants to be let go, while Ben wants every extraordinary measure to be taken. Richard prepares to ask for Catherine’s hand in marriage, but she rejects him before he can even kneel on one knee. Dan, Callie's chief of police and one-time date, makes his way back into the hospital, creating an awkward patient-boyfriend dynamic that Callie doesn't like.

Owen and April go overseas for what was an original 3-month, military surgical training program, but April keeps extending her leave despite Jackson’s pleas for her to come home. Jackson and Jo work on a pair of burn victims who bond over their circumstances and the loss of a bad boyfriend. Almost a year passes since Meredith took off, but Alex finally receives a call from Meredith telling him everyone’s fine and to stop calling. In Ellis-like fashion, Meredith, who has run away, is very pregnant, but she's the only one who knows.

Callie continues to work with Dan after she had to amputate his leg. During therapy, she helps him learn to walk with one of her robotic limbs that she fondly remembers she created with Derek. Amelia has an emotional breakdown at the hospital, which leads to her buying drugs. Owen finds her at Meredith and Derek’s house, where she is seriously thinking about taking the drugs. Owen is able to coax her out of it, and Amelia confronts her feelings head-on and without drugs for the first time since the death of her baby. On Valentine’s Day, Ben shows Bailey that it's in his will that if something happens, he wants to be unplugged like Bailey; however, Bailey doesn't like this new decision of his, as she had just learned to accept his wanting to live at all costs.

April surprises Jackson by returning from her military leave with no warning, and Catherine comes around and proposes—in front of the whole hospital—to Richard, who accepts with passion. The parallels between Meredith and her mother, Ellis, continue as Meredith begins to bleed in the kitchen. Holding her stomach, she tells Zola to dial 9-1-1. Just as Meredith saved Ellis’ life, Zola saved Meredith’s. Meredith delivers a healthy baby girl, who she names Ellis. To Meredith’s surprise, Alex shows up at the hospital because he was listed as her emergency contact person. They all return to Seattle, where she finally decides that she must move on and start over.

Reception

Broadcast
"She's Leaving Home" was originally broadcast on April 23, 2015 in the United States on the American Broadcasting Company (ABC). The episode was watched by a total of 8.74 million. down from the previous episode. In the key 18-49 demographic, the episode scored a 2.6 in Nielsen ratings, down 7 percent from the previous episode, but it was the second highest rated episode since the mid-season premiere three months before in both total viewers and in the 18-49 demographic. It was the second best TV show in the 8.00 pm slot, beating Bones, The Vampire Diaries, The Odd Couple and a rerun on The Blacklist, but was beaten by The Big Bang Theory. It was the best TV show in the 9.00 pm slot, beating Mom, The Blacklist, Backstrom and Reign.

The 8.74 million people tuned into the episode marked an 8 percent decrease from the previous episode (9.55), in addition to the installment's 2.6 Nielsen rating in the target 18–49 demographic marked a 7 percent decrease from the previous episode (2.8). The Nielsen score additionally registered the show as the week's highest rated drama and third-highest rated scripted series in the 18–49 demographic, only behind CBS's The Big Bang Theory (3.4) and ABC's Modern Family (2.9).

Reviews
The reviews for She's Leaving Home were hugely mixed with the critics majorly criticizing the writing and the lack of emphasis on the death of Derek Shepherd but praising the performance of the majority of the cast. Entertainment Weekly criticized the lack of screen time for Pompeo and lack of emphasis on the death of the show's male lead stating, "The two-hour episode, very rarely touched on Derek, actually, it rarely touched on anything of great importance—hell, we barely saw Meredith." However, acknowledging Pompeo's absence the site wrote, "I get that her absence helped make the episode conclusion stronger, Meredith’s quiet examination of Derek’s belongings powerfully describes his absence, and powerfully explains why she had to leave, but still: Could we at least have gotten just a little more time with her?" The site summed up the episode by writing, "Like the episode before it, this one wasn’t particularly good. It was unevenly paced and didn’t focus enough on the parts that truly mattered. But when it succeeded, it really succeeded: Amelia’s scene with Owen and Meredith’s homecoming were both examples of Grey’s at its honest, raw best. They weren’t enough to make up for Derek Shepherd’s departure—but then again, is anything enough to make up for that?"

TV Equals gave a mixed review for the episode stating, "The episode was definitely a mixed bag for me, I’m still not sure how I feel about last night’s two-hour farewell," criticizing the lack of screen time for Derek's funeral. "You know what we did not get a lot of? Outward acts of mourning or grieving. Had this been a typical hour-long episode,  the very minimal time spent on Derek’s funeral or hearing Derek’s loved ones and colleagues reflect on his life is much more noticeable," adding, "The subplot with ladies in the burn unit was an unexpected, yet pleasant surprise. It was a much more natural extension of the episode’s theme of not choosing to be alone. The writers were clearly trying to do the same with Richard and Catherine, but I found the material with the women in the burn unit to be much more heartfelt." The site added, "It was good to see her not choose to be alone in the end. That was a much more entertaining choice than simply having her spend nearly two hours crying or staring longingly at Derek’s side of the bed," and praised Justin Chambers' character: "I liked Alex’s determination to be Meredith’s “person” and Meredith finally welcoming her person back into her life when she gave birth to Ellis," and added, "The more I see them interact, the more I love the dynamic between Maggie and Alex."

Praising Sara Ramirez's performance the site wrote, "Callie’s reflection on Derek’s life and contributions was probably the most satisfying of all the doctors.  We were getting close to the end of the second hour and I was feeling more sleepy than sad – then Callie happened. Callie’s tears and comments about Derek were what finally brought on the waterworks for me. The moment was sweet and Sara Ramirez nailed it." TVOverMind also praised Chambers' character: "Jo and Alex are still going strong, and their house becomes home base for the tight knit group of doctors the way it was back during Alex and Meredith’s intern days. Getting on with his life doesn’t stop Alex from worrying about his best friend, and he doesn’t stop calling Meredith everyday for months."

Ashley Bissette Sumerel of TV Fanatic gave a mixed to positive review mainly praising Ellen Pompeo's character, "The episode manages to be both incredibly poignant and emotional, yet a little disappointing at the same time," adding, "Something that I've appreciated about Grey's Anatomy Season 11, in general, is the way it has brought focus back to Meredith Grey's character."  
She also praised Scorsone' performance, "Kudos, as usual, to Caterina Scorsone for portraying such difficult emotions in such a raw way," but she too criticized lack of the focus on the death of Dempsey's character, "The male lead of a show that has been on for eleven seasons has been killed off, yet a large amount of time is spent focused on other things, particularly since his death affects everyone, but this episode simply tries to do too much. And that's saying a lot, since it happens to be two-hours long." Broadway World strongly criticized the episode and wrote, "Seeing Meredith sleep in that big, empty bed alone is a powerful enough image. They could've taken us through the grief in a much neater way. This could have been a brilliantly emotional hour of television. Instead, we got two hours of useless elements that dragged on for two hours," and added the decline in quality of the show stating, "and it was never as good as Grey's Anatomy once was. I don't know if it's a change in writers, directors, actors, or a mesh of all of that, but this is not the same show." Us Weekly noted that fans, "particularly took issue with Shepherd's funeral that lasted a measly 10 minutes. Meredith was barely around in the first hour, and it went from Easter to Christmas in a matter of 30 minutes," but added that, "As for some of the episode's better moments? Grey's fans were moved (aka cried uncontrollably) by everyone's reaction to Derek's tragic death."

References

External links
 "She's Leaving Home: Part 1" on IMDb 
 "She's Leaving Home: Part 2" on IMDb

Grey's Anatomy (season 11) episodes
2015 American television episodes
Television episodes about funerals